Charles Campbell (born 5 August 1969) is a Canadian actor who portrayed the role of Chuck the Technician on Stargate Atlantis.

Early life
Campbell was born in Halifax, Nova Scotia. He got a BA in Theatre at Dalhousie University. He now resides in Vancouver, British Columbia.

Career
Campbell started his career in acting working with theatre troupes touring the US and Canada. He later moved to Toronto to start work in film and television, and also did a lot of radio and voice acting

Stargate Atlantis

Campbell was hired as a stand in for Joe Flanigan for Stargate Atlantis:"Rising" but was actually used as the stand-in for David Hewlett, and continued to be his stand-in until the show ended. He was given an acting role in the Season 1 episode "The Brotherhood" by Martin Wood and appeared in over thirty episodes.

For three seasons, Campbell's character did not have a name, and he was always credited as "the technician". In "First Strike", Weir refers to Campbell's character as Chuck. Speaking at the Pegasus 2 convention in the UK, Campbell stated that he thought this was a mistake on Torri Higginson's part, but Martin Wood decided to keep the scene. The character continued to be called Chuck on-screen, but is given no surname. On the DVD commentary tracks, he has been referred to, jokingly, as "Chucknician", an amalgam of Chuck and technician.

Other roles

Campbell played Tsunaron in the Jason film Jason X. This last installment was made with a more tongue-in-cheek feel than the others, which was one of the factors which made Chuck consider the role. In an online interview, Chuck was asked the question: 'Why do you think the Friday the 13th movies have been a bigger hit than other thrillers featuring serial killers?'

His response: "Interesting question! I think it might be the car accident syndrome, where sometimes you don't WANT to look, but you always end up turning your head to see what happens. They are so unrealistic and usually quite graphic with their violence, that it becomes almost silly, and you start to laugh and wonder how is the next person going to die. Maybe everybody just likes a really good villain, and I think Jason is probably in the top five."

Campbell once played Benvolio in a production of Romeo and Juliet which starred a fellow Stargate Atlantis cast member Claire Rankin as Juliet.

Filmography
Anna's Storm – DJ Dan (2007)
Painkiller Jane 1x07 Higher Court – exhibitor (2007)
Sanctuary Web/TV series 1x02, 3x14 – Two Faced Guy (2007, 2011)
Stargate SG-1 10x03 The Pegasus Project – Technician (2006)
Stargate Atlantis – Technician (Chuck) (2005–2009)
Kingdom Hospital 1x13 Finale – flashback scene guest (2004)
Just Cause 1x11 Fading Star – Gettaway Records executive (2002)
Jason X – Tsunaron (2002)
Angel Eyes – young man (2001) credited but scene cut from final release
Twice in a Lifetime 2x21 Final Flight – Dan (2001)
Phase IV – Nathan (2001)
The Last Debate – bartender (2000)
Possessed – dying G.I. (2000)
Pelswick – Boyd Scullarzo (voice) (2000)
Urban Legends: Final Cut – man in aeroplane (2000)
Earth: Final Conflict 3x21 Abduction – paramedic (2000)
The Misadventures of Tron Bonne – Bon Bonne (2000)
Superstar – Owen Flanagan (1999)
Strange Justice – Johnny (1999)
Genius – Hugo Peplon (1999)
Toron ni kobun – Bon Bonne (voice) (1999)
My Dog Vincent – O'Brien Higgins (lead role) (1998)
In the Mouth of Madness – customer (1995)
Are You Afraid of the Dark? Season 2 Episode 13 – The Tale of The Dark Dragon – Keith (1993)
Road to Avonlea 4x05 Moving On – Calvin Murphy (1993)
Class of 96 1x02 They Shoot Baskets, Don't They? – Gamps (1993)

References

External links

The Official Chuck Campbell Website

1969 births
Living people
Canadian male film actors
Canadian male television actors
Canadian male voice actors
Male actors from Halifax, Nova Scotia